The Mambucaba River is a river of Rio de Janeiro state in southeastern Brazil. It lies adjacent to the historic village of Mambucaba.

See also
List of rivers of Rio de Janeiro

References
Brazilian Ministry of Transport

Rivers of Rio de Janeiro (state)